Alberto Pérez Quintana (born 29 April 1996) is a Spanish footballer who plays for UD Alzira as a central midfielder.

Club career
Born in Cádiz, Andalusia, Quintana was a Cádiz CF youth graduate. On 15 December 2014, shortly after making his senior debut with the reserves, he signed a contract extension with the club, running until 2018.

On 17 May 2015, as the Yellow Submarine was already qualified to the play-offs, he made his first team debut by starting in a 0–3 away loss against Arroyo CP in the Segunda División B championship. The following campaign, he contributed with 11 appearances as his side returned to Segunda División after six years.

Quintana made his professional debut on 19 August 2016, coming on as a second-half substitute for Migue in a 1–1 away draw against UD Almería. Three days later, he was loaned to third-tier club FC Cartagena, in a season-long deal.

After being sparingly used, Quintana was recalled by Cádiz and loaned back to CF Rayo Majadahonda on 28 December 2016, until the following June. The following 17 August, he joined another reserve team, Atlético Levante UD in Tercera División.

References

External links

Alberto Quintana profile at Cadistas1910 

1996 births
Living people
Footballers from Cádiz
Spanish footballers
Association football midfielders
Segunda División players
Segunda División B players
Tercera División players
Cádiz CF B players
Cádiz CF players
FC Cartagena footballers
CF Rayo Majadahonda players
Atlético Levante UD players
Vélez CF players
Arcos CF players
UD Alzira footballers